The 1453 Yellow River flood was a natural disaster in the area surrounding Shawan in Shandong, China, during the Ming dynasty. The banks  repaired just the year before  burst again in the fourth lunar month and again in the fifth.

See also
 1452 Yellow River floods

References

Disasters in Ming dynasty
Yellow River Floods, 1453
Yellow River Floods, 1453
Yellow River floods
15th-century floods

1453 natural disasters